Kate Drummond (born October 21, 1975) is a Canadian film, television, theatre and voice actress; film producer, director and screenwriter. Kate starred as Nikki Bender alongside Brooke Shields in Hallmark Channel's Flower Shop Mystery TV movie series, she played Agent Lucado in the television series Wynonna Earp (2016 - 2017), as Authority Phydra in Utopia Falls (2020), and won best lead performance in a TV movie at the Canadian Screen Awards, for playing Claire Porter in Nowhere - Secrets of a Small Town (2019). In 2022, she starred alongside Kevin Hart and Woody Harrelson in The Man from Toronto (2022 film).

Early life
Kate Drummond was born on October 21, 1975 in Woodstock, Ontario, Canada; and raised in Sarnia, Ontario. Her father was a police officer and her mother worked at a milk factory, before both switched to real estate while Kate was at primary school. After  graduating from St. Patrick's Catholic High School in Sarnia, Drummond attended McMaster University in Hamilton, Ontario, obtaining Bachelor's degrees in 1998 in Kinesiology and Education.

Kate worked as a full-time elementary school teacher for the Ottawa Catholic School Board for 12 years, before taking her first acting class at the age of 30, where she realised her "creative expression". Kate attended acting classes for 5 years, acting only in local theatre before deciding to leave teaching in 2006 and start her acting career.

Career
Drummond played a leading role as Nikki Bender alongside Brooke Shields in Hallmark Channel's Flower Shop Mystery TV movie series, where her character and Shields' are best friends running a flower shop.

In 2016, Drummond landed a recurring role as Agent Lucado in seven episodes of the television series Wynonna Earp. In 2020, Kate played the role of Authority Phydra in Utopia Falls TV series.

In 2022, She appeared as Agent Lawrencein the Netflix dark comedy movie The Man from Toronto, alongside Kevin Hart and Woody Harrelson.

Kate has also performed voices in several video games, she plays the lead character Anna Grimsdottir (Grim) in the Tom Clancy's Splinter Cell: Blacklist (2013), and Assassin's Creed Odyssey in 2018 (see image).

Recognition
 In March 2020, Drummond featured as a role model in an article of Women of Influence
2015 Drummond played a small role as a neighbour in a scene with Jacob Tremblay in the award winning 2015 film Room.
2016 Drummond wrote and directed the  2016 film Go Fish which was awarded Best Feature (Narrative) by the Muskoka Independent Film Festival.
 In 2020, Kate Drummond was nominated for and won  Best lead performance in a TV movie, for Nowhere to be Found by the Canadian Screen Awards. The same film was nominated for Best Movie, Best Writing and Best Photography. Following the 2020 nomination, Drummond was reported to say “It’s truly an incredible honour, to those who think you may be too old to pursue a dream: It is never too late.”

Filmography

Film

Television movies

Television series

Video games

Awards and nominations

References

External links
 Official website
 

1975 births
Living people
Actresses from Ontario
Canadian film actresses
Film producers from Ontario
Canadian television actresses
Canadian women film directors
Canadian women film producers
Canadian women screenwriters
Film directors from Ontario
People from Woodstock, Ontario
21st-century Canadian actresses
21st-century Canadian screenwriters
McMaster University alumni